Cevher is a Turkish given name. Notable people with the name include:

 Cevher Özden (1933–2008), Turkish banker
 Cevher Özer (born 1983), Turkish basketball player
 Cevher Toktas (born 1987), Turkish footballer

Turkish masculine given names